Penstemon rydbergii, commonly known as Rydberg's penstemon or meadow penstemon, is a perennial plant in the plantain family (Plantaginaceae) that grows in damp, grassy meadows of the Great Basin and Rocky Mountains of the western United States.

References

External links
Jepson: Penstemon rydbergii var. oreocharis

rydbergii
Flora of the Great Basin
Flora of the Northwestern United States
Flora of the Southwestern United States
Flora of California
Flora of New Mexico
Flora of the Cascade Range
Flora of the Sierra Nevada (United States)
Flora without expected TNC conservation status